Danny Gary Hart (born 26 April 1989) is an English footballer.

Career
Born in Hendon, Hart played for Boreham Wood in the 2006–07 season. In October 2007 he was loaned out to Northwood for one month. In February 2008 he was loaned out to Wivenhoe Town for one month. Later in the year he joined Thurrock on loan, a loan spell which was extended until the end of the season. On 29 January 2010, Hart signed for Hemel Hempstead Town on a one-month loan deal. At the start of the 2010–11 season he joined Thurrock again on loan. He was released by Barnet in January 2011.

On 3 March 2011, Hart signed for Harrow Borough of the Isthmian League Premier Division. He then joined St Albans City. On 10 December 2013 Hart made his debut from the substitute's bench for Wingate & Finchley in a 2–0 away defeat to Bury Town.

He later joined Ware in 2016, teaming up with Ken Charlery who was the assistant manager during Hart's time at Harrow Borough and St Albans City.

In the summer of 2016, Hart moved to Southern Football League side Potters Bar Town.

References

External links

Danny Hart at Aylesbury United

1989 births
Living people
Footballers from Hendon
English footballers
Association football midfielders
Boreham Wood F.C. players
Barnet F.C. players
Northwood F.C. players
Wivenhoe Town F.C. players
Thurrock F.C. players
Hemel Hempstead Town F.C. players
Harrow Borough F.C. players
St Albans City F.C. players
Wingate & Finchley F.C. players
Ware F.C. players
Potters Bar Town F.C. players
English Football League players
National League (English football) players
Isthmian League players
Southern Football League players